The Blue Yonder EZ Harvard is a Canadian designed and built, single-engined, single-seat aircraft provided as a completed aircraft or in kit form by Blue Yonder Aviation. The aircraft is a 75% scale replica of the North American Harvard trainer of the Second World War.

The aircraft can be constructed in Canada as a basic ultra-light, or amateur-built aircraft, but is not currently available as an advanced ultra-light.

Development
The EZ Harvard was designed by Wayne Winters of Indus, Alberta and based on the earlier EZ King Cobra. The project was started as a customer request for a scale Harvard replica and was later offered as a commercially available kit aircraft.

The fuselage was redesigned to give the round cross section, glazed canopy and distinctive fin shape of the original Harvard. The aircraft retained the Junkers ailerons of the original Merlin wing along with the Clark "Y" airfoil and construction featuring a leading edge "D" cell and foam ribs. The fuselage is constructed of welded 4130 steel tube.

The prototype of the new design flew in 2002.

The EZ Harvard has a large round cowling that can accommodate a variety of powerplants:

Rotax 503 
Rotax 582 
Rotax 912

Operational history
Despite being widely demonstrated no further orders have been received for the type and the prototype remains the sole flying example.

Specifications (Rotax 582)

See also

References

External links

 Blue Yonder Aviation

Low-wing aircraft
EZ Harvard
2000s Canadian ultralight aircraft
Homebuilt aircraft
Replica aircraft